Anthonie Hals or Anthony Hals (19 October 1621 – 25 January 1691) was a Dutch Golden Age painter from the Northern Netherlands and the son of Dirck Hals.

He was born in Haarlem and was first taught by his father. He moved to Amsterdam in 1652 and married there in 1654 with his cousin Reynier Hals as his witness. He is known for portraits and genre works.

References

1621 births
1691 deaths
Dutch Golden Age painters
Dutch male painters
Artists from Haarlem